In polyhedral combinatorics, the hypersimplex  is a convex polytope that generalizes the simplex. Equivalently,  can be obtained by slicing the -dimensional unit hypercube  with the hyperplane of equation  and, for this reason, it is a -dimensional polytope when .

Properties
The graph formed by the vertices and edges of the hypersimplex  is the Johnson graph .

Alternative constructions
An alternative construction (for ) is to take the convex hull of all -dimensional -vectors that have either  or  nonzero coordinates. This has the advantage of operating in a space that is the same dimension as the resulting polytope, but the disadvantage that the polytope it produces is less symmetric (although combinatorially equivalent to the result of the other construction).

The hypersimplex  is also the matroid polytope for a uniform matroid with  elements and rank .

Examples
The hypersimplex  is a -simplex (and therefore, it has  vertices).
The hypersimplex  is an octahedron, and the hypersimplex  is a rectified 5-cell.

Generally, the hypersimplex, corresponds to a uniform polytope, being the -rectified -dimensional simplex, with vertices positioned at the center of all the -dimensional faces of a -dimensional simplex.

History

References

Further reading
.

Polytopes